Milton SC is a Canadian soccer club formed in 2014. The team is currently a member of the Canadian Academy of Soccer League. Their home venue is located at Milton Community Sports Park in the town of Milton, Ontario.

History 
In 2014, professional soccer returned to the town of Milton under a joint effort by Jasmin Halkic and his son Jasmin Halkic Jr. Milton entered the Second Division of the Canadian Soccer League. Their original home venue was located at Bishop Reding SS and the team acquired the services of Stefan Ristic, Slavko Nenadov, Bajro Junuzovic, and Agata Jefferson. In their debut season the club finished sixth in the standings, and reached the semifinals, where they faced SC Waterloo, but were defeated by a score of 4–2. 

The following season Milton was promoted to the First Division while maintaining a reserve squad in the second division, and Amir Osmanlic was appointed head coach. In order to remain competitive in the league's top division the club recruited several imports such as Kenyan international Adam Shaban, and Radovan Ivković, Zoran Belošević, Adnan Smajic, and Predrag Papaz from Europe. Milton clinched the final postseason berth by finishing seventh in the standings. Their opponents in the quarterfinals were Toronto Croatia, but were eliminated  by a score of 4–0. In the second division Milton reached the CSL Championship final where they faced Waterloo and they won the match by a score of 3–1 with goals coming from Smajić, Danny Jirta, and Lucky Maghori. At the conclusion of the season the league awarded Osmanlic with the CSL Coach of the Year award.

On August 29, 2016 Milton partnered with Youth Development Soccer Academy to serve as its youth wing. For the 2016 season Milton strengthened their roster with the signings of Haris Fazlagić, Vladimir Vujasinović,  Dado Hadrovic, and Damion Scott. Milton struggled throughout the regular season in their second season in the top division, but received a postseason berth due to a shortage of teams for the 2016 season. In the first round of the playoffs they faced regular season champions York Region Shooters, where they were eliminated from the competition by a 5-0 defeat. 

In 2019, Milton along with Comet FC, Galaxy SC, Halton United, London City SC, and Star FC became charter members of the Canadian Academy of Soccer League (CASL).

Roster

Honours
CSL D2 Championship (1): 2015

Head coaches

Year-by-year

References

External links
Milton SC website

Soccer clubs in Ontario
Milton, Ontario
Canadian Soccer League (1998–present) teams
Association football clubs established in 2014
2014 establishments in Ontario